Formula Renault 2.0 Italia was a Formula Renault 2.0 racing series that is based in Italy.  The series raced mostly on Italian races but it had regular races at Belgium's Circuit de Spa-Francorchamps and in Spain.

Several Formula One drivers raced in this series, including Felipe Massa, Kamui Kobayashi, Robert Kubica and Pastor Maldonado.

Regulations
Each championship round included 2 races lasting about 30 minutes. Points were awarded as follows:

In each race, 1 bonus point was awarded for pole position and 1 point for fastest lap. Only classified drivers were awarded points.

Champions

References

External links
 RenaultSportItalia.it, Formula Renault 2.0 official website.

Formula Renault 2.0 series
Formula Renault Championship
Recurring sporting events established in 2000
Recurring events disestablished in 2012
Defunct auto racing series
Formula Renault